In education, cramming is the practice of working intensively to absorb large volumes of information in short amounts of time. It is often done by students in preparation for upcoming exams, especially just before them. Usually the student's priority is to obtain shallow recall suited to a superficial examination protocol, rather than to internalize the deep structure of the subject matter. Cramming is often discouraged by educators because the hurried coverage of material tends to result in poor long-term retention of material, a phenomenon often referred to as the spacing effect. Despite this, educators nevertheless widely persist in the use of superficial examination protocols, because these questions are easier to compose, quicker (and therefore cheaper for the institution) to grade, and objective on their own terms. When cramming, one attempts to focus only on studies and to forgo unnecessary actions or habits.

In contrast with cramming, active learning and critical thinking are two methods which emphasize the retention of material through the use of class discussions, study groups and individual thinking. Each has been cited as a more effective means of learning and retaining information as compared to cramming and memorization.

Prevalence 
In Commonwealth countries, cramming usually occurs during the revision week (week before exams), also known as "swotvac" or "stuvac".

As a study technique 
H.E. Gorst stated in his book, The Curse of Education, "as long as education is synonymous with cramming on an organized plan, it will continue to produce mediocrity."

Generally considered an undesirable study technique, cramming is becoming more and more common among students both at the secondary and post-secondary level. Pressure to perform well in the classroom and engage in extracurricular activities in addition to other responsibilities often results in the cramming method of studying. Cramming is a widely used study skill performed in preparation for an examination or other performance-based assessment.

Most common among high school and college-aged students, cramming is often used as a means of memorizing large amounts of information in a short amount of time. Students are often forced to cram after improper time utilization or in efforts to understand information shortly before being tested. Improper time management is usually the cause for last-minute cramming sessions, and many study techniques have been developed to help students succeed instead of cramming.

School performance 
Teaching students to avoid last-minute cramming is a large area of concern for education professionals and profit for educational corporations and businesses. Learning and teaching study techniques that enhance retention as opposed to learning for a single examination is one of the core issues that plagues colleges and university academic advisors, and also adds to the stress of academic success for students. Ideally, proper study skills need to be introduced and practiced as early as possible in order for students to effectively learn positive study mechanisms.

According to William G. Sommer, students in a university system often adapt to the time-constraints that are placed upon them in college, and often use cramming to perform well on tests. In his article, Procrastination and Cramming: How Adept Students Ace the System, he states "Many students outwardly adapt to this system, however, engage in an intense and private ritual that comprises five aspects: calculated procrastination, preparatory anxiety, climactic cramming, nick-of-time deadline-making, and a secret, if often uncelebrated, victory. These adept students often find it difficult to admit others into their efficient program of academic survival."

See also
 Active learning
 Cram (game show)
 Cram school
 Critical thinking
 Rote learning
 Spaced repetition
 Study skills

References

External links 
Cramming on wikiHow
Cramming Techniques on TestTakingTips.com
The dangers of cramming for exams, Penn State University
Cram My Brain provides free cramming software and offers foreign language support (requires Adobe Flash)

Academic slang
Learning methods
Student culture